Hollibaugh is a surname. Notable people with the surname include:

Amber L. Hollibaugh (born 1946), American writer, filmmaker, and activist
Jonathan J. Hollibaugh (1891–1953), American politician 
Marge Hollibaugh (1921–1997), Canadian feminist